Joseph Patrick Douglass (born January 23, 1950) is a retired American basketball coach. He was most recently the men's head coach at UC Irvine from 1997 to 2010.

Early life and education
Born in Knoxville, Tennessee, Douglass moved to Barstow, California as a teenager and graduated from Kennedy High School. He graduated from the University of the Pacific in 1972 with a bachelor's degree in biology and teaching credential in physical education.

Coaching career
Douglass climbed the coaching ladder, first at the high school level as head coach at Dixon High School from 1973 to 1975, then Manteca High School from 1975 to 1979. He stepped up to the junior college ranks, guiding Columbia Junior College from 1979 to 1981.

Douglass spent six seasons at Eastern Montana (now known as MSU-Billings), with an overall record of 119–57.

In his 10 seasons at Cal State Bakersfield, Douglass compiled a 257–61 record, won three Division II national championships, and reached the Elite Eight seven times.

Head coaching record

References

1950 births
Living people
American men's basketball coaches
American men's basketball players
Basketball coaches from California
Basketball coaches from Tennessee
Cal State Bakersfield Roadrunners men's basketball coaches
Columbia Claim Jumpers men's basketball coaches
High school basketball coaches in the United States
Montana State Billings Yellowjackets men's basketball coaches
Pacific Tigers men's basketball players
People from Barstow, California
Sportspeople from Knoxville, Tennessee
UC Irvine Anteaters men's basketball coaches